Manntra is a Croatian rock band from Umag, formed in 2011. After the disbandment of the industrial metal band Omega Lithium, two of its members, Marko Matijević Sekul and Zoltan Lečei, went on to form Manntra.

The band gained popularity in Russia, Germany and Austria.

History

Beginnings and Horizont (2011-2013)
The band's debut studio album titled Horizont, was released on 29 November 2012. The album includes songs as "Kiša" and "Horizont" which were previously released as singles. The album was recorded in 2012 in Croatia and Slovenia and was entirely produced by the band's lead vocalist.

Dora 2019 (2019–present)
On 17 January 2019, the band was announced as one of the 16 participants in Dora 2019, the national contest in Croatia to select the country's Eurovision Song Contest 2019 entry, with the song "In the Shadows".

Band members
Current members
Marko Matijević Sekul – lead vocals, guitar, keyboards 
Zoltan Lečei – bass guitar 
Andrea Kert – drums 
Marko "Pure" Purišić – guitar 

Former members
Danijel Šćuric – bass guitar 
Filip Majdak – guitar 
Boris Kolarić – guitar, bagpipes, mandolin 
Maja Kolarić – bass guitar

Discography
 Horizont (2012)
 Venera (2015)
 Meridian (2017)
 Oyka! (2019)
 Monster Mind Consuming (2021)

References

External links

2011 establishments in Croatia
Croatian heavy metal musical groups
Industrial metal musical groups
Musical groups established in 2011